Prostanthera splendens is a species of flowering plant in the family Lamiaceae and is endemic to Western Australia. It is a small, spreading shrub with small, densely glandular, egg-shaped leaves and mauve to light purple flowers, paler on the inside with mauve to reddish-brown dots.

Description

Taxonomy
Prostanthera splendens was first formally described in 1988 by Barry Conn in the journal Nuytsia from specimens collected by Charles Gardner near Mount Barloweerie in 1931.

Distribution and habitat
This mintbush grows in pebbly soil on breakaways in the Coolgardie and Mallee biogeographic regions of Western Australia.

Conservation status
Prostanthera splendens is classified as "Priority One" by the Government of Western Australia Department of Parks and Wildlife, meaning that it is known from only one or a few locations which are potentially at risk.

References

splendens
Flora of Western Australia
Lamiales of Australia
Taxa named by Barry John Conn
Plants described in 1988